Maxim Rakov (born 7 February 1986) is a Kazakhstani judoka.

Rakov won the 2009 World Championship in the men's half-heavyweight (−100 kg) division, beating Henk Grol in the final.  He won the silver medal at the 2011 World Championships, losing to Tagir Khaybulaev in the final.

Previously, he had competed in the middleweight (−90 kg) category, winning a silver medal at the 2006 Asian Games. In 2007 he had a shoulder injury that required surgery. As a result, he missed the 2008 Olympics and considered to retire from sport. His father, who also served as his coach, encouraged him to continue. At the 2012 Games he was eliminated in the first bout. At the 2016 Rio Olympics he lost in the second bout to the eventual winner Lukáš Krpálek.

References

External links

 
 2010 Asian Games profile
 2006 Asian Games profile

1986 births
Living people
Sportspeople from Karaganda
Kazakhstani male judoka
Judoka at the 2012 Summer Olympics
Judoka at the 2016 Summer Olympics
Olympic judoka of Kazakhstan
Kazakhstani people of Russian descent
Asian Games medalists in judo
Judoka at the 2006 Asian Games
Judoka at the 2010 Asian Games
Judoka at the 2014 Asian Games
Asian Games silver medalists for Kazakhstan
Asian Games bronze medalists for Kazakhstan
Medalists at the 2006 Asian Games
Medalists at the 2010 Asian Games
Medalists at the 2014 Asian Games